Fruhstorferiola is a genus of grasshoppers, subfamily Melanoplinae, tribe Podismini Jacobson, 1905 and subtribe Tonkinacridina Ito, 2015; the type species was identified from Vietnam, but a majority of species are found only in China.

Species
The Orthoptera Species File lists the following:
Fruhstorferiola brachyptera Zheng, 1988
Fruhstorferiola cerinitibia Zheng, 1998
Fruhstorferiola huangshanensis Bi & Xia, 1980
Fruhstorferiola huayinensis Bi & Xia, 1980
Fruhstorferiola kulinga (Chang, 1940)
Fruhstorferiola okinawaensis (Shiraki, 1930) (Japan)
Fruhstorferiola omei (Rehn & Rehn, 1939)
Fruhstorferiola rubicornis Zheng & Shi, 1998
Fruhstorferiola rufucorna Zheng & Yang, 1999
Fruhstorferiola sibynecerca Zheng, 2001
Fruhstorferiola tonkinensis (Willemse, 1921) - type species from  "Than-Moi" (probably in Lạng Sơn Province), Vietnam (as junior homonym "Fruhstorferia"); also found in southern China (also under synonym Longgenacris rufiantennus Zheng & Wei, 2003)
Fruhstorferiola viridifemorata (Caudell, 1921)
Fruhstorferiola xuefengshana Fu & Zheng, 2000

References

External links
 Plazi.org: Pictures and descriptions of Fruhstorferiola including type (retrieved 29 November 2021)
 
 

Acrididae
Insects of Southeast Asia